Pseudolasiobolus is a genus of fungus in the family Tricholomataceae.
A monotypic genus, it contains the single species Pseudolasiobolus minutissimus, described by German mycologist Reinhard Agerer in 1983.

See also

List of Tricholomataceae genera

References

Tricholomataceae
Monotypic Agaricales genera
Fungi described in 1983